The canton of Gramat is a canton in France. Since the French canton reorganisation which came into effect in March 2015, the communes of the canton of Gramat are:

Albiac
Alvignac
Le Bastit
Bio
Carlucet
Couzou
Durbans
Flaujac-Gare
Gramat
Issendolus
Lavergne
Miers
Padirac
Reilhac
Rignac
Rocamadour
Thégra

References

Gramat